I-Level were a British post-disco, R&B band, known for their underground UK club tracks "Minefield" and "Give Me" (also released as "Give Me What You Can't Get Back"). Under license to the US label Epic Records, the band had some chart success in the UK and US. Other tracks by the outfit included "In the Sand" and "In the River".

History
Sam Jones met Joe Dworniak at Music Works, Holloway Road Studio, where the latter worked as an audio engineer.  At the time Jones was a member of the band Brimstone and later they went on to form I-Level with Duncan Bridgeman. They were signed to Virgin Records in 1982 by Mick Clark and were signed a publishing deal with April Music by Lucien Grange.  They went on to release two albums and eight singles and were awarded 'Most Promising Newcomers' by the readers of the music magazine Blues & Soul in 1982.

Over the years "Give Me" has been sampled by Sandy Kerr on "Thug Rock" (1982); AZ featuring Nas on "Gimme Yours" on the 1995 album Doe or Die; Lost Boyz on "So Love" on their 1997 album, Love, Peace & Nappiness; and A Tribe Called Quest on "Give Me" (featuring Noreaga) on their 1998 album, The Love Movement.  "Give Me" was released on the compilation album Gary Crowley's Lost 80s (2019).

In 1985, I-Level disbanded and worked on music projects with other musicians. All three band members continued their music careers as record producers.

Discography

Albums

Singles

References

External links

British contemporary R&B musical groups
Virgin Records artists
Musical groups from London